Nebria posthuma is a species of ground beetle in the Nebriinae subfamily that is endemic to Italy.

References

External links
Nebria posthuma at Carabidae of the World

posthuma
Beetles described in 1898
Beetles of Europe
Endemic fauna of Italy